Murney is a surname. Notable people with the surname include:

 Christopher Murney (born 1943), American actor and vocal artist
 Dylan Murnane (born 1995), Australian footballer
 Edmund Murney (1812–1861) was a lawyer and political figure in Upper Canada
 Hugh Murney (born 1939), Scottish footballer
 Paige Murney (born 1995), British amateur boxer